Mas Amable is the second studio album by Ecuadorian musician DJ Python. It was released on 10 April 2020 by Incienso.

Critical reception

At Metacritic, which assigns a weighted rating out of 100 to reviews from mainstream critics, the album has an average score of 82 based on 6 reviews, indicating "universal acclaim".

Track listing

Notes
 "Oooophi" and "Mmmm" are stylized in all lowercase

References

2020 albums